Veli-Matti ”Läjä” Äijälä (born 29 September 1958) is a Finnish musician, comics artist and poet. He is best known as the singer and primary songwriter of the legendary hardcore punk band Terveet Kädet.

Äijälä has been associated with many side projects like the synthpop band Leo Bugariloves, rockabilly group Billy Boys and noise rock band Death Trip. In 2004 Äijälä released a compilation album Passions of Läjä Äijälä which includes music of Terveet Kädet and eight of his side projects.

Läjä Äijälä has been working as a comics artist since the 1980s. He has released several comics albums and a book of his poems. Äijälä has also done the artwork for some album covers. One of his works is the cover of Johannes Kastaja by CMX.

References 

1958 births
20th-century Finnish male singers
Punk rock singers
Finnish comics artists
People from Tornio
Living people